Alchemy is Leah Andreone's second full-length album. It contains the song "Lamentation", which was used on the FOX network television show So You Think You Can Dance.

Track listing 
All songs by Leah Andreone
 "Sunny Day"
 "Swallow Me"
 "Bow Down"
 "Starstruck Bastard"
 "Porn"
 "Tighten It Up"
 "You Don't Exist"
 "Dive In"
 "Inconceivable"
 "Try To Take Your Time"
 "Pretty Freak"
 "Fake"
 "A Private Affair" 
 "Lamentation"

References 

1998 albums
Leah Andreone albums
Albums produced by Bob Marlette
RCA Records albums